Tecolotito is an unincorporated community and census-designated place in San Miguel County, New Mexico, United States. The word "Tecolotito" has its origin in the Nahuatl language. Adopted into Spanish it means "small owl." The population of the community was 232 as of the 2010 census, of which 213 people were of Hispanic origin.

Geography
New Mexico State Road 386 passes through the community

Demographics

Education
Its school district is Santa Rosa Consolidated Schools.

References

Census-designated places in New Mexico
Census-designated places in San Miguel County, New Mexico